Barbora Záhlavová-Strýcová was the defending champion, but lost to Anna Karolína Schmiedlová in the final, 6–4, 6–2.

Seeds

Main draw

Finals

Top half

Bottom half

References 
 Main draw

Empire Slovak Open - Singles